is a Japanese manga series written and illustrated by Chihiro Ishizuka. It has been serialized in Kodansha's Bessatsu Shōnen Magazine since August 2012, with its chapters collected in eleven tankōbon volumes as of June 2022. An anime television series adaptation produced by J.C.Staff aired between April and June 2016.

Plot
The story is about Makoto, a young witch from Yokohama, who moves to Hirosaki, Aomori to live with relatives as part of her training. What follows is Makoto's daily life as she gets used to her new environment. Her relatives and the new friends she makes there are introduced to the customs and peculiarities of witchcraft.

Characters

A witch in training who moves to live with her relatives in Aomori. She is a polite and kind girl who gets lost easily, and is more focused on preparing potions than casting spells. She has a black cat familiar named Chito.

 A 17-year-old black cat who is Makoto's familiar.

Kei's little sister and Makoto's cousin. Initially wary of Makoto, whom she found strange when they first met, she quickly comes to like her after Makoto takes her flying on a broom. She is fascinated with magic and eagerly watches Makoto when she does something that involves witchcraft or something supernatural. She also enjoys sweets. She becomes Akane's apprentice to learn more about magic and to later become a witch herself. After wishing to be able to use magic, Makoto and Inukai manage to inadvertently create a ring filled with mana from a tooth from Hamabe (a sea spirit who befriended Chinatsu). The ring then bonded with Chinatsu and enabled her to use water magic.

Chinatsu's older brother and Makoto's cousin.

 Kei and Chinatsu's father and Nana's husband. He speaks in a Tsugaru dialect. In the English dub, Keiji speaks with a country accent.

Kei and Chinatsu's mother. She is familiar with the world of witchcraft and doesn't find some of the odd things that happen because of Makoto strange at all. She illustrates and writes children books professionally as her job.

Makoto's older sister and a full-fledged witch. She contrasts with Makoto in both personality and appearance. While Makoto is polite and softly spoken, Akane is more brash and loud-mouthed, though still just as kind. She also has brown skin and white hair, which contrasts with Makoto's pale skin and black hair. Makoto mentions that many people say that they don't have much in common. Akane cares deeply for Makoto and takes time off from her travels all around the world to visit and check on her sister regularly. She also has a Siamese cat familiar named Kenny.

 A Siamese cat who is Akane's familiar.

Kei's friend, whose family runs a liquor store.

 A witch from Akita who specializes in fortune-telling, and is also Akane's friend. After a night of heavy drinking, she ate some chocolates which turn people into animals, made by Akane, and became an anthropomorphic dog. As the chocolates didn't work correctly she simply has the face, ears, and tail of a dog, as well as furry skin, and returns to her human form at night. She has been looking for a way to contact Akane for a year to find a cure which will return her to human form permanently. Due to her half-animal appearance, she wears a cloak that covers her face and body so that she doesn't draw attention. Kei admits that she is his type of girl after seeing her as a human. She has a hamster familiar named Al.

 A white hamster who is Inukai's familiar. It wears a small bow tie.

 A witch who lives nearby Kei and Chinatsu's house. While soft-spoken and somewhat reserved, she's an amateur archaeologist and has a love for history. She has a brown owl familiar named Aurore.

 A brown owl who is Anzu Shiina's familiar.

 Anzu's mother and the owner of Cafe Concrucio, She is also a witch.

 A female ghost who was born in 1906 Japan (Meiji Era) and now works at the Cafe run by Anzu's mother. She is very shy towards others as shown when Makoto, Kei and Chinatsu visit the cafe.

Harbinger of Fall

Media

Manga
Written and illustrated by Chihiro Ishizuka, Flying Witch began in Kodansha's shōnen manga magazine Bessatsu Shōnen Magazine on August 9, 2012. Kodansha has collected its chapters into individual tankōbon volumes. The first volume was released on December 9, 2013. In 2019, Partial sales from the eighth volume were donated to Kyoto Animation after the Kyoto Animation arson attack. As of June 9, 2022, eleven volumes have been released.

North American publisher Vertical announced their license to the series during their panel at Anime Central on May 22, 2016. The first volume was released in Spring 2017.

Volume list

Anime
An anime television series adaptation aired from April 10 to June 26, 2016. Sentai Filmworks has licensed the series in North America and produced an English dub. Animatsu Entertainment has licensed the series in the UK.

Episode list

Notes

References

External links
  at Bessatsu Shōnen Magazine 
  
 

Anime series based on manga
Comedy anime and manga
Iyashikei anime and manga
J.C.Staff
Kodansha manga
Nippon TV original programming
Sentai Filmworks
Shōnen manga
Vertical (publisher) titles
Witchcraft in anime and manga
Witchcraft in television
Witchcraft in written fiction